Ciprian Manolescu (born December 24, 1978) is a Romanian-American mathematician, working in gauge theory, symplectic geometry, and low-dimensional topology. He is currently a professor of mathematics at Stanford University.

Biography
Manolescu completed his first eight classes at School no. 11 Mihai Eminescu and his secondary education at Ion Brătianu High School in Piteşti. He completed his undergraduate studies and PhD at Harvard University under the direction of Peter B. Kronheimer. He was the winner of the Morgan Prize, awarded jointly by AMS-MAA-SIAM, in 2002. His undergraduate thesis was on Finite dimensional approximation in Seiberg–Witten theory, and his PhD thesis topic was A spectrum valued TQFT from the Seiberg–Witten equations.

In early 2013, he released a paper detailing a disproof of the triangulation conjecture for manifolds of dimension 5 and higher. For this paper, he received the E. H. Moore Prize from the American Mathematical Society.

Awards and honors
He was among the recipients of the Clay Research Fellowship (2004–2008).

In 2012, he was awarded one of the ten prizes of the European Mathematical Society for his work on low-dimensional topology, and particularly for his role in the development of combinatorial Heegaard Floer homology.

He was elected as a member of the 2017 class of Fellows of the American Mathematical Society "for contributions to Floer homology and the topology of manifolds".

In 2018, he was an invited speaker at the International Congress of Mathematicians (ICM) in Rio de Janeiro.

In 2020, he received a Simons Investigator Award. The citation reads: "Ciprian Manolescu works in low-dimensional topology and gauge theory. His research is centered on constructing new versions of Floer homology and applying them to questions in topology. With collaborators, he showed that many Floer-theoretic invariants are algorithmically computable. He also developed a new variant of Seiberg-Witten Floer homology, which he used to prove the existence of non-triangulable manifolds in high dimensions."

Competitions
He has one of the best records ever in mathematical competitions:
 He holds the sole distinction of writing three perfect papers at the International Mathematical Olympiad: Toronto, Canada (1995); Bombay, India (1996); Mar del Plata, Argentina (1997).
 He placed in the top 5 on the William Lowell Putnam Mathematical Competition for college undergraduates in 1997, 1998, and 2000.

Selected works

References

External links
 Manolescu's Stanford Page
 The Clay Mathematics Institute page
 
 
 

21st-century Romanian mathematicians
21st-century American mathematicians
Topologists
Harvard University alumni
University of California, Los Angeles faculty
People from Alexandria, Romania
1978 births
Living people
Romanian emigrants to the United States
International Mathematical Olympiad participants
Geometers
Fellows of the American Mathematical Society
Putnam Fellows